UniCredit Bank Slovenia is a Slovenian bank, which was a subsidiary of Italy-based UniCredit Group. According to the bank, UniCredit Bank Slovenia had a market share of 7.6% in Slovenia, in terms of total loans as of 30 September 2015.

Bank Austria was the intermediate parent company of UniCredit Bank Slovenia, which UniCredit Group acquired Bank Austria's parent company HypoVereinsbank in 2005 (in turn acquired Bank Austria and Bank Austria Creditanstalt d.d. Ljubljana). In September 2016, UniCredit Group eliminated the intermediates by holding the stake directly by UniCredit S.p.A.

On 21 December 2016, lesser than a month that the ultimate parent company UniCredit Group sold €17.7 billion bad loan portfolios (in gross book value) to institutional investors, UniCredit Bank Slovenia also sold approx. €110 million non performing credit portfolio to B2 Kapital without recourse. As at 31 December 2015, UniCredit Bank Slovenia, together with its subsidiary, had €183.359 million loans that were classified as bad loan.

References

External links
  

Banks of Slovenia
UniCredit subsidiaries
Companies based in Ljubljana